David Chadwick Smith  (August 12, 1931 – May 22, 2000) was a Canadian economist, and the sixteenth Principal of Queen's University from 1984 to 1994.

In 1993, he was made a member of the Order of Canada. He was made a fellow of the Royal Society of Canada in 1976.

References
 

1931 births
2000 deaths
Alumni of Balliol College, Oxford
Canadian economists
Fellows of the Royal Society of Canada
Harvard University alumni
McMaster University alumni
Members of the Order of Canada
Principals of Queen's University at Kingston
Academic staff of the Queen's University at Kingston
20th-century Canadian economists
Presidents of the Canadian Political Science Association
20th-century political scientists